A Woman of Independent Means is a 1995 American period drama television miniseries directed and produced by Robert Greenwald from a teleplay by Cindy Myers, based on the 1978 book of the same name by Elizabeth Forsythe Hailey. The miniseries stars Sally Field (who also served as an executive producer), with Ron Silver, Tony Goldwyn, Jack Thompson, Sheila McCarthy, Brenda Fricker, and Charles Durning in supporting roles. It follows for some seven decades the story of Bess Alcott, from her Dallas marriage to her fourth-grade sweetheart to the birth of three children to the fussings with grandchildren.

The miniseries received four Primetime Emmy Award nominations, including Outstanding Miniseries and Outstanding Lead Actress in a Miniseries or a Special for Field, winning one for its costume design. Field was also nominated for a Golden Globe Award and a Screen Actors Guild Award for her performance.

Cast
 Sally Field as Bess Alcott Steed Garner
 Ron Silver as Arthur Fineman
 Tony Goldwyn as Robert Steed
 Jack Thompson as Sam Garner
 Sheila McCarthy as Totsie
 Brenda Fricker as Mother Steed
 Charles Durning as Andrew Alcott
 Ann Hearn as Lydia
 Lawrence Monoson as Walter Burton
 Richard Dillard as Richard Prince
 John S. Davies as Howard Blackstone
 Rutherford Cravens as Marvin Hamilton
 Christina Stojanovich as Eleanor (child)
 Emmy Barker as Eleanor (teen)
 Andrea Roth as Eleanor (adult)
 Cameron Finley as Drew (child)
 Christopher Fox as Drew (teen)
 Andrew Lowery as Drew (adult)
 Trevor Meeks as Robin (child)
 Matthew Loehr as Robin (teen)
 John Slattery as Dwight
 Margaret Bowman as Old Nanny
 Pam Dougherty as Second Jessamine Sister
 Jimmy Ray Pickens as St. Louis Bellhop
 Gena Sleete as Mrs. Maxwell
 Angie Bolling as Mrs. Fleck
 Rodger Boyce as Eleanor's Doctor

Episodes

Reception

Critical response
A Woman of Independent Means received praise for the performances of the cast, particularly that of Field. Tony Scott of Variety stated that "Greenwald, with the reminiscing Bess as his constant object, directs Field and the large cast with admirable skill". Ken Tucker of Entertainment Weekly gave the miniseries a grade of B, writing that it "has a pleasingly diffuse, almost aimless structure" and "is stubbornly, intriguingly true to its title". Tom Shales of The Washington Post described it as "an absurdly lengthy parade of episodes, some of them admittedly moving, that fails to achieve any kind of meaningful cumulative impact".

Accolades

References

External links
 

1995 American television series debuts
1995 American television series endings
1990s American drama television series
1990s American television miniseries
NBC original programming
Television series about widowhood
Television series based on American novels
Television series set in the 20th century